Francesca Clapcich (born 28 January 1988 in Trieste) is an Italian sports sailor. At the 2012 Summer Olympics, she competed in the Women's Laser Radial class, finishing in 19th place. At the 2016 Olympics, she competed in the women's 49erFX class with Giulia Conti, finishing in 5th place.

Since she has competed with Giulia Conti. The pair scored numerous successes in the newly formed class 49er FX class, including 2015 victory in Italian, European and World Championships. On 27 October 2015 Conti and Clapcich were awarded the Golden Collar sporting merit award, the highest honor conferred by CONES.

In 2016, they came second at the European Championships.

In 2017-18, she was a crewmember on Turn the Tide on Plastic in the Volvo Ocean Race.

References

External links
 

Italian female sailors (sport)
Living people
Olympic sailors of Italy
Sailors at the 2012 Summer Olympics – Laser Radial
49er FX class sailors
Sailors at the 2016 Summer Olympics – 49er FX
1988 births
Sportspeople from Trieste
49er FX class world champions
World champions in sailing for Italy
Volvo Ocean Race sailors
Sailors of Centro Sportivo Aeronautica Militare
21st-century Italian women